Vieuphoria is a long form music video by American alternative rock band The Smashing Pumpkins, originally released on VHS on October 4, 1994, and DVD on November 26, 2002. It was certified gold by the RIAA in late 1996.

The video consists of various Smashing Pumpkins performances, mostly from the Siamese Dream tour, interspersed with comedy bits (including "Meet the Frogs"), interviews, featurettes, and other short videos.

The soundtrack for the film, Earphoria, was released as a promo CD in 1994 and officially in 2002.

Track listing

The DVD also includes the complete interview with Manny Chevrolet and The Lost '94 Tapes, which were found by Billy Corgan shortly before the DVD release. The performances are:
"Quiet"
"Snail"
"Siva"
"I Am One"
"Geek U.S.A."
"Soma"
"Hummer"
"Porcelina"
"Silverfuck"

"Porcelina" should not be confused with the similarly titled "Porcelina of the Vast Oceans" from the album Mellon Collie and the Infinite Sadness.

Personnel
The Smashing Pumpkins
Jimmy Chamberlin – drums
Billy Corgan – vocals, guitar
James Iha – guitar, vocals
D'arcy Wretzky – bass guitar, vocals, percussion on "Mayonaise"

Additional musicians
Eric Remschneider – electric cello on "Soma", "Hummer", and "Porcelina"

Production
Modi – direction

References

The Smashing Pumpkins video albums
The Smashing Pumpkins live albums
1994 video albums
Live video albums
1994 live albums
Virgin Records live albums
Virgin Records video albums